Leslie Howard (1893–1943) was an English stage performer who became star of Hollywood films during the 1930s.

Leslie Howard may also refer to:
Leslie Howard (musician) (born 1948), Australian-born British pianist and composer
Leslie Burr Howard (born 1956), American Olympic equestrian

See also
Howard (surname)